Rabba Ishq Na Hove (International Title: Forbidden Love) was a Hindi television series that aired on Zee TV channel from 26 July 2005 to 18 April 2006, based on a triangular love story. The series initially aired Tuesdays and later started airing Mondays and Tuesdays.

Concept
The show is based on the life of Veera, an air-hostess who lives in a company owned flat, although her parents stay in the same city. Her passionate, almost violent desire to be independent, and her no-nonsense practicality, set her apart from other girls. Vivan is a playboy who flirts with Veera and then breaks her heart. Later, he realizes that he has fallen in love with her, and tries to reconcile with her. But she wants nothing to do with him. In the meantime, she meets Kushan, a mature and sensitive man who eventually becomes her husband. Now comes the twist in the story, when Veera learns that Vivan is the younger brother of her husband Kushan. From there the lives of these three take several unexpected turns and become very hard life.

The show ends with all the problems solved and Kushan and lives happily ever after. The last episode also shows Vivan married to his best friend  Megha and Siddharth; Kushan's cousin brother married to Neha; Veera's sister.

Cast
 Sangeeta Ghosh as Veera
 Varun Badola as Kushan 
 Loveleen Mishra / Gulrez Khan as Megha
 Nikhil Arya as Vivan
 Aruna Irani as Reema (Veera's Mother)
 Pooja Ghai Rawal as Amisha
 Karishma Randhawa as Pooja
 Indira Krishnan as Kushan & Vivan's Aunt
 Shilpa Shinde as Juhi
 Vishal Watwani
 Rahul Lohani
 Kiran Kumar as Prashant (Veera's Father)
 Adi Irani

References

External links
 Official Site

2005 Indian television series debuts
2006 Indian television series endings
Indian television soap operas
Zee TV original programming